Abdulrahman Al-Dawla Al-Mutawa Al-Qenaei (born 1941 in Kuwait City) is a former Kuwaiti footballer. He played from 1961 until 1972, and scored 105 goals for his team in the league competition. He was the top scorer in the Kuwait Premier League in 1962–63, 1964–65, 1965–66 and 1966–67. He was also a basketball player.

Abdulrahman also played for the Kuwait national football team. He is the first player to score an official goal for the Kuwait national football team.

Club career statistics

References

Dawla
Dawla
Dawla
Dawla
Dawla
Dawla
Dawla
Dawla
Dawla